Events in the year 1910 in Japan. It corresponds to Meiji 43 (明治43年) in the Japanese calendar.

Incumbents
Emperor: Emperor Meiji
Prime Minister: Katsura Tarō

Governors
Aichi Prefecture: Ichizo Fukano
Akita Prefecture: Mori Masataka
Aomori Prefecture: Takeda Chiyosaburo
Ehime Prefecture: Takio Izawa
Fukui Prefecture: Nakamura Junkuro
Fukushima Prefecture: Shotaro Nishizawa
Gifu Prefecture: Sadakichi Usu
Gunma Prefecture: Uruji Kamiyama
Hiroshima Prefecture: Tadashi Munakata
Ibaraki Prefecture: Keisuke Sakanaka
Iwate Prefecture: Shinichi Kasai
Kagawa Prefecture: Motohiro Onoda then Kogoro Kanokogi
Kanagawa Prefecture: Kenzo Ishihara then Goro Sugiyama
Kochi Prefecture: Kenzo Ishihara then Goro Sugiyama
Kunamoto Prefecture: Kawaji Toshikyo
Kyoto Prefecture: Shoichi Omori
Mie Prefecture: Yoshisuke Arita
Miyagi Prefecture: Hiroyuki Terada
Miyazaki Prefecture: Tadayoshi Naokichi
Nagano Prefecture: Akira Oyama then Chiba Sadamiki
Niigata Prefecture: Prince Kiyoshi Honba
Saga Prefecture: Nishimura Mutsu then Fuwa
Saitama Prefecture: Shimada Gotaro
Shiname Prefecture: Maruyama Shigetoshi
Tochigi Prefecture: .....
Tokyo: Hiroshi Abe
Tottori: Oka Kishichiro Itami
Toyama Prefecture: Usami Katsuo then Tsunenosuke Hamada
Yamagata Prefecture: Mabuchi Eitaro

Events

May 14 – The Japan–British Exhibition opens at White City, London, the largest international exposition the Empire of Japan had participated in up to that time.
May 20 – Kōtoku Incident: police searching the room of Miyashita Takichi, discover a socialist-anarchist plot to assassinate the Japanese Emperor Meiji, leading to mass arrests.
August 22 – Japan–Korea Treaty of 1910: Japan formally annexes Korea. The treaty was proclaimed to the public (and became effective) on August 29, 1910, officially starting the period of Japanese rule in Korea.
October 1 – The Nippon Columbia record label is founded by Nipponophone Co., Ltd.
November – A confectionery brand Fujiya founded in Yokohama.
December - The Japanese Antarctic Expedition leaves Tokyo, led by Nobu Shirase.

Births
January 7 – Masako Shirasu, novelist (d. 1998)
January 21 – Hideo Shinojima, footballer (d. 1975)
February 6 – Komako Hara, film actress (d. 1968)
February 19 – Prince Nagahisa Kitashirakawa (d. 1940)
March 12 – Masayoshi Ōhira, politician (d. 1980)
March 23 – Akira Kurosawa, screenwriter, producer, and director (d. 1998)
May 16 – Higashifushimi Kunihide, Buddhist monk (d. 2014)
September 10 – Kozaburo Hirai, composer (d. 2002)
October 10 – Ichiji Tasaki, biophysicist (d. 2009)
November 10 – Takeo Fujisawa, businessman (d. 1988)
November 15 – Yatarō Kurokawa, actor (d. 1984)

Deaths
March 3 – Sasaki Takayuki, government minister and court official (b. 1830)
April 15 – Tsutomu Sakuma, career naval officer and pioneer submarine commander (b. 1879)
April 22 – Rokuzan Ogiwara, sculptor (b. 1879)
June 11 – Kataharu Matsudaira daimyō (b. 1869)
July 3
Tokugawa Akitake, daimyō (b. 1853)
Matasaburō Watanabe, politician (b. 1850)
August 2 – Inoue Masaru, Director of Railways in Japan (b. 1843)
August 26 – Ume Kenjirō, legal scholar (b. 1860)
September 13 – Sone Arasuke, politician and Japanese Resident-General of Korea (b. 1849)
October 24 – Yamada Bimyō, novelist (b. 1868)
November 5 – Nishio Tadaatsu, daimyō (b. 1850)

See also 
 List of Japanese films of the 1910s

References

 
1910s in Japan